The Estonian Female Young Footballer of the Year is an annual award given to the best Estonian female young footballer.

Winners

See also

 List of sports awards honoring women

References

External links
 Official website

 
Estonia 4F
Lists of Estonian sportspeople
Estonian sports trophies and awards
Women's association football player of the year awards
Association football player non-biographical articles